Gordon-Cumming is the surname of:

Catherine Rose Gordon-Cumming, maiden name of Katie Fforde (born 1952), British novelist
Constance Gordon-Cumming (1837–1924), Scottish travel writer and painter
Eliza Maria Gordon-Cumming (1795-1821), Scottish scientist
Roualeyn George Gordon-Cumming (1820-1866), Scottish traveller and sport hunter
William Gordon-Cumming (disambiguation), one of several people with the name

See also
Sir Charles Gordon-Cumming-Dunbar, 9th Baronet (1844-1916), Anglican priest
Charlotte Gordon Cumming (born 1958), Scottish musician
Gordon (surname)
Cumming (surname)

Compound surnames
English-language surnames